The Workingman's Institute and Memorial Hall (The Institute and Memo) is an historical miners' institute, working men's club and multi-purpose community centre in Newbridge in South Wales which includes a memorial to those from the town who died in the World War I and World War II. It also houses a library, reading rooms, an art deco cinema, a Sprung floor dance floor and a theatre. The Hall was built in 1908 and in 1924 the Memorial Hall was added. The whole project was paid for from small contributions from the local miners.

History
The history of this community centre began when a group of local miners created a committee for the improvement of social conditions of miners in Newbridge in 1898. This committee occupied a room in the Beaufort Arms hotel in Bridge Street and later two rooms in a coffee tavern. Coal was vital to the economy and industry of Great Britain and the Newbridge miners wanted to improve themselves in a world where the labour force was becoming more and more important. The miners committee moved to more spacious premises when the proprietor of a coffee shop in the village allocated two rooms in the institution.

A Workmen's institute was necessary to create greater social cohesion and other educational and leisure activities and the committee secured the freehold site for £300. Community members W.N.Jones, V.Phillips, H.Badge and H.J.Thomas were of crucial importance in this process. The Newbridge Workingman's Institute building was constructed by a commissioned architect R. L. Roberts. It was officially opened in 1908 by Mr. John Beynon the owner of the Celynen Colliery.

In this building were: an extensive library, billiards room with four tables, a committee room and a reading room.

In October 1914 the British Army entered the First World War and Newbridge delivered on front line coal and soldiers. Demobilisation was passed in November 1920 but of course not all the town's young men returned home. Newbridge decided to construct a memorial to those who had lost their lives in 'the war to end all wars'. The memorial's contractor was Ewart Evans and it cost about £10,000. The building was erected under the oversight of by E. D. T. Jenkins (architect) and opened in 1924; local residents nicknamed it the 'Memo'. In this building were: a picture house and stage on the upper floor, with a dancehall, along with dressing room facilities, on the lower floor. After the Second World War the 'Memo' also became a monument to victims of that war too.

Mining eventually ceased in the mid-1980s, after persevering on through the 1926 United Kingdom general strike, the 1930s Depression and post-war nationalisation, but became unsustainable following the UK miners' strike (1984-1985), with the Institute becoming a drinking club.

In 2004, when the local council was considering purchasing the land for a car park, a public meeting called by local MP Don Touhig, led to the formation of The Friends of Newbridge Memo, who managed to have the building selected as one of the potential projects on the BBC2 programme Restoration.
BBC has shown this series about 19 July 2004. They narrowly missed winning the final but received assistance from the Heritage Lottery Fund to begin the long process of raising money to restore both buildings.

After a development grant was awarded by the Heritage Lottery Fund in the summer of 2009, Cadw and Caerphilly County Borough Council are actively supporting the scheme and the Big Lottery awarded £500,000 in December 2009.

Entertainment
The centre was popular as an amateur theatre in Wales between the wars. Productions included Henrik Ibsen's "Ghosts" produced by E. Eynon Evans and starring Donald Houston.  In the 1930s–1950s The Memo was also a popular music hall. Artistes included Mrs. Clara Novello Davies, Webster Booth, Anne Ziegler, Owen Brannigan, John Hargraves and accompanist Gerald Moore, Joe Loss.

The Newbridge Memo has also been used to film popular BBC dramas such as Doctor Who and Sherlock. 2 episodes of Doctor Who have been filmed, 
these are the 10th Doctor story The Doctors Daughter and the 11th Doctors story Nightmare in Silver written by Neil Gaimen

From the mid-1970s through the 1980s, the Memo became a concert venue for rock bands. Bands included Iron Maiden, Dave Edmunds, Dire Straits (25 June 1978; Dire Straits tour), The Stranglers, The Cars, Motörhead, Whitesnake, Vinegar Joe, Red Hot Pokers, Paul Young, Mickey Gee, Paul King, The Groundhogs, Shakin Stevens, Dr. Feelgood, Tom Robinson Band, Marillion. Shockhead

This building has also been used in filming scenes for television and radio, which have included Restoration for the BBC (2004), Ghost Stories for ITV Wales, and the movies Very Annie Mary (2001) and Flick (2008).

Awards and nominations

References

External links

Publications
 
 

|-

Dance venues in Wales
Buildings and structures completed in 1908
Grade II listed buildings in Caerphilly County Borough
1908 establishments in Wales
Clubhouses in the United Kingdom
Working men's clubs